734 may refer to:
734, the year 734 C.E.
734 (number)
Area code 734, which is the area code of parts of southeastern Michigan
734 (song), by Juice Wrld, from the album Goodbye & Good Riddance